Be'er Ya'akov (lit. Jacob's Well) is a city in central Israel, near Ness Ziona and Rishon Lezion. The town has an area of 8,580 dunams (~8.6 km²), and had a population of 30,338 in 2022.

History

Be'er Ya'akov was established in 1907 on 2,000 dunams of land purchased by a company headed by Meir Dizengoff from a Lutheran German colony the previous year. It was divided into two sectors, one for immigrants from Russia, Poland, Romania, Bulgaria, Argentina, and Iran, and the other for Mountain Jews from Dagestan. It was named after Yaakov Yitzhaki, a rabbi and pioneer from the Mountain Jewish community. Yitzhaki headed the Mountain Jewish pioneers who settled there.

In 1909, there were 25 families living in Be'er Ya'akov, and tensions between the Ashkenazi and Dagestani families. In 1910, the first elementary school was established. According to a census conducted in 1922 by the British Mandate authorities, Be'er Ya'akov had 131 inhabitants, which had increased in the 1931 census to 265 residents in 58 houses.  By 1947, it had a population of 400. It achieved local council status in 1949.

During the 1948 Arab–Israeli War, and until the Israeli capture of Ramla in July 1948, Be'er Ya'akov was on the front line. The population at that time was evacuated and a new settlement, Be'er Shalom, was established nearby by members of Kibbutz Buchenwald, the first pioneer training group formed in post-World War II Germany.

In 2017, a plan was approved to build on the land vacated by the Tzrifin military bases which are being relocated to the Negev. The plan envisions Be'er Ya'akov with a population of 100,000. Be'er Ya'akov is currently undergoing a construction boom, with numerous residential and commercial developments planned or under construction, along with numerous schools and daycare centers, cultural institutions, and a 1,000-seat sports arena. A metro system for the city which will terminate at Ben Gurion International Airport is also planned, with work scheduled to commence in 2028.

Economy 
IAI's MLM Division, Israel's main missile assembly facility is located in the south of Be'er Ya'akov. The Jericho and Arrow missiles and the Shavit launch vehicle are assembled there. The facility area is situated east of Diezengoff Street.

Healthcare
Two hospitals are located in Be'er Ya'akov: Yitzhak Shamir Medical Center (near Tzrifin), and Shmuel HaRofe Geriatric Hospital.

Sports
Maccabi Be'er Ya'akov is the local football club.
Maccabi Be'er Ya'akov B.C., the local basketball club, plays in Liga Leumit, the second tier.

Transportation
Be'er Ya'akov is served by the Be'er Ya'akov Railway Station, for trains on the Binyamina-Ashkelon line.

Notable residents
Ron Atias, taekwondo athlete who represented Israel at the 2016 Summer Olympics
Noam Dar, professional wrestler
Moshe Peretz, singer
Yaakov Yitzhaki, founder of the settlement of the city Be'er Ya'akov
Idan Zalmanson (born 1995), basketball player

References

Jewish villages in Mandatory Palestine
Local councils in Central District (Israel)
Populated places established in 1907
1907 establishments in the Ottoman Empire